Lacewood Productions was a Canadian animation studio based in Ottawa, Ontario. It produced a television series, Katie and Orbie, as well as specials based on For Better or For Worse, and the 1990 feature The Nutcracker Prince. In 1997, Paragon Entertainment Corporation took over the studio due to debt reasons. Paragon eventually folded, with most of Lacewood's library and former assets being acquired by Amberwood Entertainment in 2000.

Lacewood was the successor to Hinton Animation Studios, a company created by Sheldon Wiseman, which closed down due to debt problems.

The first productions made by the studio were The Railway Dragon and its sequel The Birthday Dragon.

Lacewood has also done animation services on the first season of The Ren and Stimpy Show.

Lacewood has also done animation production in partnership with Universal Cartoon Studios on season 2 of Problem Child, Monster Force and 1995 episodes of The Savage Dragon.

See also
Canadian animation
 Tooth Fairy, Where Are You?

References

Canadian animation studios
Companies based in Ottawa
Mass media companies established in 1988
Mass media companies disestablished in 1998
Defunct film and television production companies of Canada